Maiestas arida (formerly Recilia aridus) is a species of leafhopper from Cicadellidae family that is endemic to India. It was formerly placed within Recilia, but a 2009 revision moved it to Maiestas.

References

Insects described in 1998
Endemic fauna of India
Insects of Asia
Maiestas